Edward Matthew Fenwick (1812 – 16 October 1877), also known as Edward Matthew Reid, was a British Liberal Party politician.

Fenwick was the second son of Edward James and Caroline (née Cuddon) Reid. At some point he changed his name by Royal Licence from Reid to Fenwick. In 1841, he married Sarah Fenwick Bowen, daughter of Thomas Fenwick, and they had at least two children: Thomas Fenwick Fenwick (1842–1907), and Robert Fenwick Fenwick (–1868).

Fenwick was elected Liberal MP for Lancaster at a by-election in 1864—caused by the resignation of William Garnett—and held the seat until 1866 when he was unseated for corruption. The seat was later disenfranchised under the Reform Act 1867.

Fenwick was also a Justice of the Peace for Lancashire, Yorkshire and Westmorland, and, in 1865, Deputy Lieutenant for Lancaster.

References

External links
 

UK MPs 1859–1865
UK MPs 1865–1868
1841 births
1877 deaths
Liberal Party (UK) MPs for English constituencies